Borghild Bryhn Langaard,  (23 July 1883 – 20 November 1939) was a Norwegian operatic soprano.

Biography
Borghild Bryhn was born on 23 July 1883 in Kongsvinger. She died on 20 November 1939 in Oslo.

Career
Borghild Bryhn studied with  Gina Oselio and Nina Grieg. Her public debut was in 1906 at a concert in  Kristiania (called Oslo after 1925) featuring songs by Grieg, accompanied on piano by the composer, Edvard Grieg, himself.

Her operatic debut was in 1907 in Kristiania in the  opera
In 1908,  at  Royal Opera House, Covent Garden, she sang the role of Brünnhilde in Hans Richter and Percy Pitt's English language production of Wagner's Der Ring des Nibelungen

In the period 1908-1916, Borghild Bryhn Langaard made several gramophone recordings, including art songs by Grieg,  and excerpts from her operatic repertoire.

Footnotes

1883 births
1939 deaths
Norwegian operatic sopranos
20th-century Norwegian women opera singers
Musicians from Kongsvinger